Homalocalyx grandiflorus is a member of the family Myrtaceae endemic to Western Australia.

It blooms between October and December producing red-pink-purple flowers.

It is found on sand plains in the Goldfields-Esperance region in a small area north of Kalgoorlie of Western Australia where it grows in sandy soils.

References

grandiflorus
Plants described in 1987